Officially Hakob Paronyan State Musical Comedy Theatre, is one of the prominent theatres of the Armenian capital Yerevan, founded in 1941. It is located on Vazgen Sargsyan Street in the central Kentron district of the city, near the Republic Square. It is named after the Armenian renowned satirist Hagop Baronian.

History

The Theatre was opened on June 22, 1942. The first artistic director was Shara Talyan. Many well-known persons worked in theatre, including Artemi Ayvazyan, Vardan Ajemian, Mikael Arutchian, Karp Khachvankyan, Svetlana Grigoryan, Armen Elbakyan,  Yervand Ghazanchyan and others.

Musical Comedy Theatre participated at international theatre festivals in Armenia, Georgia, Iran, England, the United States.

In February 2009, the Best Presentation Award of Armenian Artavazd -2009 festival was given to Yervand Ghazanchyan, who is the artistic director of theatre since 1993.

See also

Sundukyan State Academic Theatre of Yerevan

References

Links
Official site

Buildings and structures in Yerevan
Theatres in Armenia
1941 establishments in Armenia